Ruki Vverh! (meaning "Hands Up!") is the name of Russian pop and dance musician Sergey Zhukov. They were originally a duo which consisted of Zhukov and Aleksey Potekhin. The duo came to prominence in the 1990s.

Discography

Covers and sampling
"Pesenka" has been covered or heavily sampled by other acts that went on to have international hits with them, including A Touch of Class's "Around the World (La La La La La)" in 2000, beFour's "Magic Melody" in 2007, Beat Ink's "Around the World" in 2008, Chris Webby's "La La La" in 2009, Auburn featuring Iyaz's "La La La" in 2010 and Ava Max's "My Head & My Heart" in 2020.
"18 Mne Uzhe" has been covered by Estonian pop group Hellad Velled as "18", which became a hit. Also Russian pop group Reflex made another cover of the song.
"Kroshka Moya" has been parodied by the Ukrainian Russophone comedy group Lyudi v Belom in a German language version titled "Meine Kleine" under the fake name Hände Hoch (Хенде Хох, meaning "Hands Up" in German).

References

External links 
 Official site 
 Official site of band member Sergey Zhukov 
 Unofficial site of "Ruki Vverh!" and Sergey Zhukov 

Russian dance musicians
Russian pop music groups
Eurodance groups
Musical groups established in 1996
Winners of the Golden Gramophone Award